Men in Pain (Traditional Chinese: 男人之苦) is a TVB modern drama series broadcast in June 2006.

Synopsis
Hong Tin-Yam (Damian Lau) is happily married to his second wife Wong Dak-Kiu (Louisa So), but one day he discovers that he cannot perform in the bedroom. He asked a female friend, Au Yeung Lei-Lei (Akina Hong), to help him out and confirmed that he was in fact impotent. Tin-Yam did not want his wife to find out about his problem causes Dak-Kiu to think that he is cheating on her, and leading to their divorce.

On the other hand, Tin-Yam's son, Hong Sai-Hei (Ron Ng) spends a night with Dak-Kiu's student, Ko Fun (Toby Leung) during an excursion. Ko Fun discovers that she is pregnant and seeks Sai-Hei's help. Both their parents are furious but eventually the two young couples get married. Ko Fun is stressed with handling the baby and her school courseload, while Sai-Hei is worried that he cannot afford to put food on the table.

How will these two men overcome their pain of manhood...?

Cast

Viewership ratings

References

External links
TVB.com Men in Pain - Official Website 

TVB dramas
2006 Hong Kong television series debuts
2006 Hong Kong television series endings